The Dogwood Dominion Award was an honor given annually to a person in American Thoroughbred horse racing. It was established in 1993 by W. Cothran "Cot" Campbell, president of the racing partnership Dogwood Stable, now based in Aiken, South Carolina. It was created to recognize the "unsung heroes" in the racing industry. The award was inspired by the multiple stakes winner Dominion (1972-1993) , who was raced by Dogwood Stable in the 1970s and who went on to become a five-time Champion Sire in England. In 2011, the Dogwood Dominion Award was no longer awarded.

Dominion Award Recipients:
2010 - Barbi Moline
2009 - Mary Lee-Butte 
2008 - Vincent Garibaldi 
2007 - Phyllis Shetron 
2006 - Pete Lizarzaburu 
2005 - Jo Anne Normile 
2004 - Pam Berg 
2003 - Neftali Gutierrez 
2002 - Shirley Edwards & Jim Greene 
2001 - Julian "Buck" Wheat 
2000 - Katherine Todd Smith 
1999 - Daniel Perlsweig
1998 - Donald "Peanut Butter" Brown 
1997- Nick Caras 
1996 - Grace Belcuore 
1995 - Peggy Sprinkles 
1994 - Howard "Gelo" Hall 
1993 - H. W. "Salty" Roberts

References

External links
 July 13, 2004 article on the Dogwood Dominion Award at About.com, a part of The New York Times Company
 The 2009 Dogwood Dominion Award

American horse racing awards